Jason Donaghy is a two-time Grammy nominated recording engineer, mixer, and producer, who has done work with artists including Band of Horses, Ryan Adams, and Josh Ritter, among others. Hailing from Dublin, he currently resides in Los Angeles, California, where he has garnered two Grammy nominations; for his work on Band of Horses' third record, Infinite Arms, and Sum 41's fifth record, Screaming Bloody Murder, respectively, while at Perfect Sound Studios.

Selected discography

Singles

External links
Perfect Sound Studios
allmusic.com | Infinite Arms: Credits
allmusic.com | Screaming Bloody Murder: Credits
MixOnline.com | Perfect Sound Gets that Perfect Sound
jasondonaghy.com | Discography

Living people
Year of birth missing (living people)
Irish record producers
Mixing engineers
Engineers from Dublin (city)
Audio engineers